Maues (Greek:  ;   (epigraphic); Kharosthi:  , , called  ,  on the Taxila copper plate; also called    ,   in the Mathura lion capital inscription,) was the first Indo-Scythian king, ruling from 98/85 to 60/57 BCE. He invaded India and established Saka hegemony by conquering  Indo-Greek territories.

Name
Maues's name primarily attested from his coins appear under the Gandhari form  and the Ancient Greek form , both of which are variants of the same Scythian Saka language name , meaning "tiger" and "hero".

Sakas

The Sakas, and/or the related Parni (who founded the Parthian Empire) and Scythians, were nomadic Eastern Iranian peoples.

The Sakas from Sakastan defeated and killed the Parthian king Phraates II in 126 B.C. Indo-Scythians established themselves in the Indus around 88 B.C., during the end of Mithridates II of Parthias reign. The Sakas and Pahlavas became closely associated during the Saka migration. This can be demonstrated from various sources, such as the adoption of names and titles. Maues took the title of "Great King of Kings", an exceeded version of a traditional Persian royal title.

Maues Campaigns 
Maues is the first recorded ruler of the Sakas in the Indus. He is first mentioned in the Moga inscription:

 "In the seventy eighth, 78, year the Great King, the Great Moga, on the fifth, 5, day of the month Panemos, on this first, of the Kshaharata and Kshatrapa of Chukhsa - Liaka Kusuluka by name - his son Patika - in the town of Takshasila..."

Mauses is possibly mentioned the Maira inscription in the Salt Range in Pakistan as 'Moasa'.

Maues vastly expanded his domain by conquering key cities along the Indus. This included seizing Taxila in Punjab, and Gandharas capital city Pushkalavati from the Indo-Greek Kingdoms. Maues has overstruck coins belonging to Archebius as well as Apollodotus II in Taxila.

The Sakas extend their power up to Mathura during his reign.

Route of the Invasions 
When precisely and under what circumstances Maues arrived in India is uncertain, but the expulsion of the Scythian (Saka/Sai) peoples from Central Asia is referred to in the Han Shu, where the cause given is their confrontation with the Ta Yüeh-chih, themselves undergoing an enforced migration. It is stated that "when the Ta Yüeh-chih turned west, defeated and expelled the king of the Sai, the latter moved south and crossed over the Suspended Crossing." That this route (from the Pamirs into the Gilgit valley) was used in Maues' time is confirmed by the discovery of inscriptions in the Chilas/Gilgit area bearing his name (Dani, 1983 and 1995, pp. 52, 55).

Coins 

Maues issued joint coins mentioning a queen Machene ("ΜΑΧΗΝΗ"). Machene may have been a daughter of one of the Indo-Greek houses.

An Indo-Greek king, Artemidoros, also issued coins where he describes himself as "Son of Maues".

Buddhist Coins 
A few of the coins of Maues, struck according to the Indian square standard, seemingly depict a King in a cross-legged seated position. This may represent Maues himself, or possibly one of his divinities. It has been suggested that this might also be one of the first representations of the Buddha on a coin, in an area where Buddhism was flourishing at the time, but the seated personage seems to hold a sword horizontally, which favors the hypotheses of the depiction of the king Maues himself.

Also, Maues struck some coins incorporating Buddhist symbolism, such as the lion, symbol of Buddhism since the time of the Mauryan king Ashoka.

The symbolism of the lion had also been adopted by the Buddhist Indo-Greek king Menander II. Maues therefore probably supported Buddhism, although whether sincerely or for political motives is unclear. His coins also included a variety of other religious symbols such as the bull of Shiva, indicating wide religious tolerance.

References

Sources
 
 
  
 
 

Indo-Scythian kings
1st-century BC rulers in Asia
Buddhism in Pakistan
Buddhism in Afghanistan
1st-century BC Iranian monarchs